Talkhouse is a digital media outlet and online magazine created in 2013 by Ian Wheeler and Tim Putnam. Musicians, actors, and filmmakers share their experiences in their respective fields in personal essays, discuss their peers’ work in editorials and reviews, and converse with one another via the Talkhouse Podcast and Talkhouse Live events.

Podcast
The Talkhouse Podcast pairs artists, musicians, filmmakers, comedians, and actors in conversations about their work. The episodes are most often focused on either music or film, but cover a wide range of topics. Episodes are unmoderated, artist-on-artist conversations that typically run from 30 minutes to an hour in length. Guests that have appeared on the podcast include Questlove, Abbi Jacobson, Fred Armisen, Alia Shawkat, David Cross, Chelsea Manning, Ian Brennan, A$AP Ferg, Lauren Mayberry, Martin Rev, Lena Dunham, Kamasi Washington, Tim Heidecker, Aidy Bryant, Seth Meyers, RZA, and Talib Kweli. Episodes are generally released every Thursday on iTunes, Stitcher, and SoundCloud. Some artists, who have appeared as guests on the Talkhouse Podcast, have gone on to collaborate with one another, for example Courtney Barnett was featured on The Breeders record, All Nerve, and Kim Deal of The Breeders was featured on Courtney Barnett's Tell Me How You Really Feel. In addition, Merrill Garbus of Tune-Yards and Laurie Anderson worked together on Anderson's art instillation, Habeas Corpus, at The Park Avenue Armory.

Elia Einhorn is the host and producer of the Talkhouse Podcast, which also features frequent appearances by Talkhouse Executive Editor Josh Modell, and Talkhouse Film Editor-in-Chief Nick Dawson. The podcast was previously hosted by former Talkhouse Music Editor-in-Chief Michael Azerrad.

Notable episodes include: Kid Cudi with Paul Reubens, for which the Talkhouse Podcast was honored by the Webby Awards in the category of "Best Individual Episode,"  Matt Berninger with Conor Oberst, Carrie Brownstein with Questlove, and Lauren Mayberry with Haim.

Sing for Science 
In 2020, Talkhouse launched the Sing for Science podcast, created and hosted by musician Matt Whyte. The podcast pairs musicians and scientists by  featuring musicians talking about their music, before transitioning into conversations related to the guest scientist's field of study.

Website
Talkhouse's website publishes personal essays, op-eds, and criticism written by artists, for artists. The editorial direction of Talkhouse includes reviews, personal essays, video essays, and playlists. Josh Modell is the Executive Editor, and Nick Dawson is the Editor-in-Chief of Talkhouse Film.

Notable pieces from the website include: Lou Reed reviewing Kanye West's Yeezus, Ezra Koenig (Vampire Weekend) reviewing Drake's Nothing Was the Same, Rose McGowan’s "Open Letter to Scott Baio and Those Like Him," and "Buzz Osborne (The Melvins) Talks the HBO Documentary Kurt Cobain: Montage of Heck."

Reception
The Talkhouse Podcast was featured in Variety as one of the top ten best music podcasts, Entertainment Weekly's "12 Best Music Podcasts" (2016) and was named a 2017 Webby Award Honoree (Podcasts & Digital Audio) for an episode featuring Kid Cudi and Paul Reubens.

See also 

 Music podcast

References

External links

Music podcasts
Online music magazines published in the United States
Magazines established in 2013
Magazines published in New York City
Music magazines published in the United States